The United States Senate election of 1922 in New York was held on November 7, 1922. Incumbent Republican Senator William Calder ran for re-election to a second term, but was defeated by Democrat Royal Copeland.

Republican nomination
Despite early opposition from the Anti-Saloon League and other discontents within the state party, some of whom attempted to draft Theodore Roosevelt Jr. or William Hayward as an alternative candidate, no candidate materialized and Calder was seen as assured of renomination by August.

Calder was renominated at the Republican convention on September 29 along with the entire Republican ticket. His renomination was carried unopposed.

Democratic nomination
It was suggested during the campaign that Tammany Hall boss Charles F. Murphy might block Al Smith's third consecutive nomination for Governor, leaving him to accept the nomination for Senate as a compromise. However, Smith carried the gubernatorial nomination unanimously, and the Senate nomination was given unanimously to Dr. Royal S. Copeland, the President of the New York City Board of Health who had gained attention for his handling of the Spanish flu pandemic.

General election

Candidates
 William M. Calder, incumbent Senator (Republican)
 Royal S. Copeland, President of the New York City Board of Health and former Mayor of Ann Arbor, Michigan (Democratic)
 Coleridge A. Hart, candidate for Judge of the Court of Appeals in 1908 and 1914 (Prohibition)
 Algernon Lee, member of the New York City Board of Aldermen (Socialist and Farmer-Labor)
 Henry Kuhn, perennial candidate (Socialist Labor)

Results

References

1922
New York
United States Senate